Carina Witthöft was the defending champion, but lost in the first round to Vera Lapko.

Julia Görges won the title, defeating Belinda Bencic in the final, 6–4, 7–5.

Seeds

Draw

Finals

Top half

Bottom half

Qualifying

Seeds

Qualifiers

Lucky loser
  Varvara Lepchenko

Draw

First qualifier

Second qualifier

Third qualifier

Fourth qualifier

References 
 Main draw
 Qualifying draw

BGL Luxembourg Open - Singles
Luxembourg Open
2018 in Luxembourgian tennis